This is a list of songs about County Louth, Ireland. 

 "Dear Dundalk" - Written and recorded by Dundalk-born musician Des Wilson (1943–1990).
 "The Town of Dundalk" - Written by George Elliot and Michael Byron, recorded by Michael Bracken.
 "The Wee County" - Written and recorded by Annie Mc.
 "The Blackbird of Slane" - Song by T. Smith about the WW1 poet Francis Ledwidge, recorded by Seán Donnelly.
 "Football Final 1957" - By Nicholas Craven. Collected by Pat Hillen and Tom Kindlon from the singing of Jemmy Dowdall. Air: "The Mountains of Mourne"
 "Grand Old County Louth"  - Written by John Nestor and Bobby O'Driscoll.
 "Victorious Roche" - Victory of Roche Emmets, 3 January 1954. Written by Jack Sands. Air: "The Soirée on Skull Hill"
 "Wren Boys Song" - A local song.
 "The Soiree at Skull Hill" - written by Willie Hynes, postman, 1912.
 "The Turfman from Ardee"
 "The Woods of County Louth" - written by Hugh McKitterick and Larry Magnier - recorded by Dermot O'Brien (1977)
 "Farewell to Carlingford"
 "The Rose of Ardee"
 "The Hurling Match at Bavan, Omeath, 1750"
 "Election Ballad of 1826"
 "Liberty's Battle" (election song)
 "Usurpation Conquered" (election song)
 "The Mountains of Cooley" - written by Eilish Boland.
 "Come sing a song for Louth" - written by Hugh McKitterick

See also
 Music of Ireland

References

 Songs of Dundalk and its Hinterland, by Séamas MacSeán, Dundalk, 1981.

Irish ballads
 
Irish styles of music
Louth
Louth